In financial markets, implementation shortfall is the difference between the decision price and the final execution price (including commissions, taxes, etc.) for a trade. This is also known as the "slippage". Agency trading is largely concerned with minimizing implementation shortfall and finding liquidity.

Decision price 
The decision price is the price of the stock that prompted the decision to buy or sell. The most common decision price is the close price or the arrival price. If we split the decision to buy a stock from the actual trading of the stock, as is often the case with fund managers (decision makers) and brokers (trade executors), you can see why both are used.

From the fund manager's point of view, his decision to trade is often based on the closing price of the day's trading (along with the entire history of the stock and other signals/indicators). When he decides to buy a particular stock the next day, it is because he believes that the price will go up from that closing price. Thus his decision price is the close price.

However the broker, unless she is explicitly told what levels to buy at or what prompted the desire to buy, does not know when or why the decision was made. Her best guess is that the current price at the time the order is received is what prompted the decision and thus her decision price is the arrival price. There is no common definition of this price, but the broker normally uses the last traded price or the "mid price" - equal to the average of the current bid and ask prices being quoted at the time the order was received.

Brokerage firms specialize in developing algorithmic strategies, and providing them to the institutional investment community, that aid in the quest to minimise slippage from benchmarks such as implementation shortfall, volume-weighted average price or time-weighted average price. Alpha Profiling is an example of an algorithmic method of minimising implementation shortfall.

See also 
 Algorithmic trading
 Market impact
 Market microstructure

External links 

 Trade Strategy and Execution (CFA Institute)
 Market impact models and optimal execution algorithms

Financial economics

Financial markets